Hatice Aslan (born 20 February 1962) is a Turkish actress who starred in Nuri Bilge Ceylan's 2008 film Üç Maymun (The Three Monkeys), for which Ceylan won the best director award at the 2008 Cannes Film Festival. Aslan was seen as a strong contender for the best actress award at the festival.

Aslan shared the Adana Golden Boll International Film Festival's Best Actress Award in 2011 together with Görkem Yeltan for her role in Vücut.

Filmography

Television

Film

References 

1962 births
People from Sivas
Turkish film actresses
Living people
Best Actress Golden Boll Award winners
20th-century Turkish actresses